Australia competed at the 2022 Winter Paralympics in Beijing, China which took place between 4–13 March 2022. A team of ten athletes including two guides was announced on 2 February 2022 with two athletes - Rae Anderson and Josh Hanlon making their Winter Paralympics debut. Jonty O'Callaghan withdrew from the team after a severe training accident on 17 February 2022. Anderson represented Australia in athletics at the 2016 Rio Paralympics.
Melissa Perrine and Ben Tudhope were appointed team captains.

Administration

Kate McLoughlin served as the Chef de Mission. McLoughlin is first woman hold the position for an Australian Winter Paralympics team and was the Chef de Mission for Australian teams at the 2016 and 2020 Summer Paralympics.

Melissa Perrine and Ben Tudhope were appointed team captains. Perrine and Mitchell Gourley carried the flag at the Opening Ceremony. Tudhope was the flag bearer at the Closing Ceremony; he had previously carried the flag at the 2014 Winter Paralympics.

Team Preparation 
Team preparation was severely disrupted by COVID restrictions in Australia as there were limited training camps and Western Australian snowboarder Sean Pollard decided to remain home due to the states strict lockdown. Team preparation was managed by Snow Australia and the Australian Institute of Sport invested $5 million over four years.

Medallists

Events

Alpine skiing

Women

Men

Snowboarding

Men

See also
Australia at the Paralympics
Australia at the 2022 Winter Olympics
Paralymics Australian Team Images from 2022 Beijing Winter Paralympics

References

External links
 Paralympics Australia Beijing 2022 site
 Paralympics Australia 2022 Winter Paralympics Media Guide

Nations at the 2022 Winter Paralympics
2022
Paralympics